The Westbury by-election was a Parliamentary by-election held on 22 February 1911. The constituency returned one Member of Parliament (MP)  to the House of Commons of the Parliament of the United Kingdom, elected by the first past the post voting system.

Vacancy
The sitting Liberal Member for Westbury, Sir John Fuller, resigned his seat in the House of Commons on his appointment as Governor of Victoria. He had represented the constituency since 1900, when he gained it from the Conservatives.

Electoral history

Candidates
The new Liberal candidate was Geoffrey Howard, who had previously been the member for Eskdale in Cumberland. He had been defeated at the last general election in December 1910. Since then he had served as a Private Secretary to the Prime Minister, H. H. Asquith.
The Conservatives re-selected local man George Palmer, their defeated candidate from the last election. He had been High Sheriff of Wiltshire in 1903 and since 1910 had been a Lieutenant-Colonel commanding the Royal Wiltshire Yeomanry.

Result
On an increased turnout, the Liberal Party held the seat with only a 1.8% swing against them.

Aftermath
A general election was due to take place by the end of 1915, and by the autumn of 1914, the following candidates had been adopted to contest it at Westbury. 
Liberal Party: Geoffrey Howard
Unionist Party:George Palmer
However, due to the outbreak of war, there was no general election until 1918. At the 1918 general election, a former Liberal member of parliament, who had joined the Labour Party in 1916, intervened in the contest, handing the seat to the Unionists.

Candidate endorsed by the Coalition Government.

References

1911 in England
1911 elections in the United Kingdom
By-elections to the Parliament of the United Kingdom in Wiltshire constituencies
20th century in Wiltshire